Gunton Meadow is a  nature reserve in Lowestoft in Suffolk. It is managed by the Suffolk Wildlife Trust.

Gunton Meadow was saved from development as a planning condition for the expansion of a local supermarket. It has scrub, a pond and grassland. There are five species of orchid including the common spotted and green-winged, and great crested newts in the pond.

There is access from Leisure Way.

References

Suffolk Wildlife Trust